The 1980 World Championships in Athletics was the second global, international athletics competition organised by the International Association of Athletics Federations (IAAF). Hosted from 14 to 16 August 1980 at the De Baandert in Sittard, Netherlands, it featured two events: the women's 400 metres hurdles and the women's 3000 metres run. West Germany's Birgit Friedmann took the first women's world title in the 3000 m, while her East German counterpart Bärbel Broschat became the first women's 400 m hurdles world champion.

Summary
Historically, the IAAF and the International Olympic Committee (IOC) agreed that the Athletics at the Summer Olympics served as the world championship event for the sport. The IAAF began to expand its programme of approved events for women and this conflicted with the Olympic athletics programme. The 400 m hurdles was recently introduced event for female athletes while the 3000 m marked the increasing popularity of long-distance running events among women. Neither event was contested at the 1980 Moscow Olympics. The boycott of those Olympics and the presence of the Liberty Bell Classic (an alternative event for the boycotting nations) gave the IAAF additional incentive to hold its own competition; although the Soviet Union withdrew, the events in Sittard attracted entries from countries on both sides of the Western and Eastern divide.

A total of 42 women from 21 nations entered the competition – there were 18 participants in the 3000 m and 24 athletes in the 400 m hurdles. The hurdles format had four heats of six athletes, two semi-finals of eight athletes, then an "A" and a "B" final. The 3000 m run had two stages: two heats of nine athletes each, followed by a final of twelve athletes.

The tournament followed the 1976 World Championships in Athletics, which featured just one event – the men's 50 kilometres walk – and was organised by the IAAF in reaction to the IOC dropping that event for the 1976 Summer Olympics. The 1980 World Championships preceded the launch of the IAAF's independent global event, with the inaugural 1983 World Championships in Athletics taking place three years later with a programme of 41 events.

One athlete, Spain's Rosa Colorado, later had her results at the championships disqualified for doping offences.

Medallists

Schedule

400 metres hurdles results

Heats

Qualifying rule: the first three athletes in each heat (Q) plus the four fastest non-qualifiers (q) progressed to the semi-finals.

Semi-finals
Qualifying rule: the first four athletes in each semi-final (Q) progressed to the "A" final. The remaining non-qualifiers were entered into the "B" final.

"A" final

"B" final

3000 metres results

Heats
Qualifying rule: the first five athletes in each heat (Q) plus the two fastest non-qualifiers (q) progressed to the final.

Final

10,000 metres results
Held alongside the men's international Netherlands vs Ireland vs Wales match, the event saw some invitation events for women which are not considered part of the World Championships. Nevertheless, the 10,000 metres appear in IAAF statistics as it was not part of the Olympic programme at the time.

Participation

 (1)
 (1)
 (4)
 (1)
 (1)
 (1)
 (3)
 (3)
 (3)
 (2)
 (1)
 (1)
 (1)
 (2)
 (1)
 (2)
 (3)
 (1)
 (6)
 (3)
 (1)

Medal table

References

Results

External links
Official IAAF website

 
World Athletics Championships
World Championships
International athletics competitions hosted by the Netherlands
World Championships in Athletics
Women's athletics competitions
Sports competitions in Sittard-Geleen
World Championships in Athletics